The Dolfines Guaraní complex is a pair of high-rise luxury apartment buildings in Rosario, Santa Fe, Argentina.

Upon completion, they became the tallest buildings in the country outside of Buenos Aires.

The towers are located on the area known as Puerto Norte, facing the Paraná River.

Notes

Buildings and structures in Rosario, Santa Fe
Residential skyscrapers in Argentina
Residential buildings completed in 2009
Twin towers